The Taiwanese Ambassador to Guatemala is the official representative of the Republic of China to the Republic of Guatemala.

History 
In 1935 diplomatic relations between the governments of Guatemala and the Republic of China were established, when the Consulate General of the Republic of China was installed in Guatemala City. 
In 1954 the rank of the representation rose from Consulate General to Legation.
In 1960 the rank of the representation rose from Legation to Embassy.

List of representatives

References 

 
Guatemala
China